Taher Nashat al-Masri (born March 5, 1942) is a Jordanian politician  who served as the 28th Prime Minister of Jordan from 19 June 1991 to 21 November 1991. He opposed the invasion of Iraq but reportedly wanted the Americans to stay in Iraq and keep it "out of the hands of the fundamentalists".

He was the Speaker of the House of Representatives of Jordan from 1993 to 1995.

He served on the Council on Foreign Relations since 2002 and is the league's commissioner for civil society.
While Prime Minister, he pressed for changes to the election law. 

He served as the President of the Senate of Jordan from 17 December 2009 to 24 October 2013.

Honors
  Grand Cordon of the Order of the Rising Sun (2020)

See also
 List of prime ministers of Jordan

References

External links
 Prime Ministry of Jordan website

1942 births
Prime Ministers of Jordan
University of North Texas alumni
Living people
Ambassadors of Jordan to Spain
Ambassadors of Jordan to France
Government ministers of Jordan
Foreign ministers of Jordan
An-Najah National University alumni
Economy ministers of Jordan
Defence ministers of Jordan
Members of the Senate of Jordan
Presidents of the Senate of Jordan
Members of the House of Representatives (Jordan)
Speakers of the House of Representatives (Jordan)
Permanent Representatives of Jordan to the United Nations
Jordanian people of Palestinian descent
Honorary Knights Grand Cross of the Order of the British Empire
Grand Crosses 1st class of the Order of Merit of the Federal Republic of Germany
Grand Cordons of the Order of the Rising Sun